is a Japanese politician of the Liberal Democratic Party, a member of the House of Representatives in the Diet (national legislature).

Career
A native of Kōfu, Yamanashi and graduate of Meiji University, where he is a visiting scholar, Akaike was elected to the House of Representatives for the first time in 2005 after three unsuccessful runs in 1993, 1995 and 2000.

Right-wing positions
Affiliated to Nippon Kaigi, Akaike holds views that are consistent with this openly revisionist lobby:
visits to the controversial Yasukuni shrine
negation of the Nanking massacre: supported right-wing filmmaker Satoru Mizushima's 2007 revisionist film The Truth about Nanjing, which denied that the Nanking Massacre ever occurred,
negation of the existence of sexual slavery for the Imperial military ('Comfort women'): among the people who signed ‘THE FACTS’, an ad published in The Washington Post on June 14, 2007, in order to protest against United States House of Representatives House Resolution 121.
supports the revision of the constitution, the return to militarism

Akaike is a member of the following Diet groups:
 Diet Celebration League of the 20th Anniversary of His Majesty The Emperor’s Accession to the Throne (天皇陛下御即位二十年奉祝国会議員連盟)
 Nippon Kaigi Diet discussion group (日本会議国会議員懇談会)
 Meeting to verify the truth of the comfort women issue and Nanjing incident (慰安婦問題と南京事件の真実を検証する会) 
 Permanent study sessions to carefully think about the vote of foreigners in local elections (永住外国人の地方参政権を慎重に考える勉強会)
 Pro-Yasukuni Alliance (みんなで靖国神社に参拝する国会議員の会)
 Association against human rights bill (人権擁護法案から人権を守る会)

See also 
Koizumi Children

References

External links 
 Official website in Japanese.

1961 births
Living people
Politicians from Yamanashi Prefecture
Koizumi Children
Members of the House of Representatives (Japan)
Members of Nippon Kaigi
Liberal Democratic Party (Japan) politicians
Nanjing Massacre deniers